Magistral is the fifth studio album by Argentine band Miranda!. It was released on September 9, 2011, by Pelo Music.

Critical reception 

In a review for AllMusic, Mariano Prunes describes the album as "a sort of return to their roots by a band that was once truly original", but whose "unexpected international success has been unequivocally steering them in the direction of generic Latin pop". At the end of the review, Prunes commented: "In brief, Magistral is a good Miranda! album, not as inspired or creative as their first two efforts, but it is less uneven and less vapid than El Disco de Tu Corazón or Miranda Es Imposible!, but it is an effort that will ultimately neither add nor subtract much from their discography".

Accolades

Track listing 
All songs were produced by Cachorro López and written by Alejandro Sergi, except where noted.

Charts

References 

2011 albums
Spanish-language albums
Miranda! albums
Albums produced by Cachorro López